What Heaven Is Like is the seventh studio album by Cincinnati, Ohio-based indie rock band Wussy. It was released on May 18, 2018, on Shake It! in the United States and on Damnably in the United Kingdom and European Union.

Track listing

References

Wussy albums
2018 albums